William Alexander Wilson (born November 3, 1986) is an American former professional baseball pitcher. He played in Major League Baseball (MLB) for the Boston Red Sox, Detroit Tigers and Milwaukee Brewers.

Early life
Wilson was born in Dhahran, Saudi Arabia where his father, Jim Wilson, worked as a geologist for Aramco. Jim played college football in the NAIA at Hanover College before being cut by the Cincinnati Bengals, declining an offer from the Green Bay Packers and returning to graduate school.

The family moved to New Orleans when Wilson was two years old and then moved to Kingsport, Tennessee, where Wilson spent the majority of his youth. Wilson grew up as a Boston Red Sox fan.

Career

College and Minor Leagues
Wilson attended Hurricane High School in Hurricane, West Virginia, then attended Winthrop University. Collegiate Baseball named him the National Freshman Pitcher of the Year in 2006. After the 2007 and 2008 seasons, he played collegiate summer baseball with the Falmouth Commodores of the Cape Cod Baseball League. In the summer of 2007, he had Tommy John surgery. He transferred to Texas A&M University in January 2008. He was drafted by the Chicago Cubs in the 10th Round of the 2008 Major League Baseball Draft, but did not sign. He was drafted by the Boston Red Sox in the 2nd Round of the 2009 Major League Baseball Draft. In November 2012, Wilson was added to the 40-man roster to protect him from the Rule 5 Draft.

Boston Red Sox
On March 16, 2013, Wilson was optioned to the Triple-A Pawtucket Red Sox to begin the season. He was called up to the Red Sox on April 7 when John Lackey went on the disabled list, and made his Major League debut on April 11. He was optioned to Pawtucket on May 29, and recalled on June 13 when Alfredo Aceves was optioned to Pawtucket.

Wilson pitched in the Major Leagues for parts of the 2013 and 2014 seasons. He threw  innings for the Red Sox in 2013 and posted a 4.88 ERA. He performed much better in his  Major League innings in 2014, recording a 1.91 ERA.

Detroit Tigers
On December 11, 2014, the Red Sox traded Wilson along with Gabe Speier and Yoenis Céspedes to the Detroit Tigers for Rick Porcello.

On May 27, 2015, Alex Wilson made his first career major league start for the Detroit Tigers, against the Oakland Athletics, throwing 52 pitches in 3 scoreless innings. Detroit went on to win 3–2.

On July 30, 2015, Wilson earned his first major league save, getting the final five outs in a 9–8 Tigers win over the Baltimore Orioles. For the season, he pitched 70 innings (including a team-high 67 in relief), with 16 games finished, 2 saves, a 2.19 ERA and a 1.03 WHIP.

During the 2016 season, Wilson set career highs with 62 appearances and 73 innings, while posting a 4–0 record with a 2.96 ERA, with 49 strikeouts and 21 walks.

On January 13, 2017, the Tigers avoided arbitration with Wilson, agreeing on a one-year, $1.175 million contract. On August 25, Wilson was ejected for the first time in his Major League career after hitting Todd Frazier with a pitch. This followed after Miguel Cabrera and Austin Romine were ejected for triggering a bench-clearing brawl and after Dellin Betances was also ejected for the first time in his Major League career after hitting James McCann with a pitch. The next day, August 25, Wilson was suspended for four games. He appealed, and had the suspension reduced to three games, which he sat out beginning on September 2.

On September 23, 2017, Wilson sustained a non-displaced fractured right fibula after he was hit by a line drive off the bat of Joe Mauer, ending his season. During the 2017 season, Wilson posted a 2–5 record, 4.35 ERA, and 42 strikeouts in 60 innings pitched.

On January 17, 2018, the Tigers avoided arbitration with Wilson, agreeing on a one-year, $1.925 million contract. In a game on May 7, 2018, Wilson hurt his foot covering first base, and was later diagnosed with a plantar fascia strain. He was placed on the 10-day disabled list the next day. He returned to action for the Tigers on June 7. For the 2018 season, Wilson pitched  innings, posting a 3.36 ERA and 43 strikeouts. On November 30, 2018, the Tigers non-tendered Wilson and he elected free agency.

Milwaukee Brewers
Wilson signed a minor league contract with the Cleveland Indians on February 9, 2019. The deal included an invitation to the Indians' major league spring training camp. He opted out of his contract with the Indians on March 21, 2019 after being informed he would not make the opening day major league roster.

Wilson signed with the Milwaukee Brewers on March 24. He was designated for assignment on April 29, 2019 and outrighted on May 1. He was released by the organization on August 3, 2019.

Chicago Cubs
On August 5, 2019, Wilson signed a minor league deal with the Chicago Cubs. He became a free agent following the 2019 season.

Return to Detroit
On January 4, 2020, Wilson signed a minor-league contract with the Detroit Tigers with an invitation to spring training.

On June 25, 2020, the Tigers released Wilson.

Wilson announced his retirement from professional baseball on July 28, 2020, and joined the Ballengee Group as an advisor.

Pitch selection
Wilson throws three primary pitches. He has a four-seam fastball that averages 92 mph (tops out at 97 mph), a two-seam fastball at 88-92 mph (tops out at 96 mph), and a slider in the 86-89 mph range (tops out at 91 mph). The two-seam fastball is used as both a cutter and a sinker. He throws the cutter more than any other pitch. Wilson also throws an occasional curveball and changeup.

Personal life
Wilson is the second Saudi-born player in MLB history, after Craig Stansberry.

Wilson and his wife Kristin have three daughters and one son.

References

External links

 

1986 births
Living people
American expatriates in Saudi Arabia
Baseball players from West Virginia
Boston Red Sox players
Detroit Tigers players
Falmouth Commodores players
Iowa Cubs players
Lakeland Flying Tigers players
Lowell Spinners players
Major League Baseball pitchers
Major League Baseball players from Saudi Arabia
Milwaukee Brewers players
Pawtucket Red Sox players
People from Dhahran
People from Hurricane, West Virginia
Portland Sea Dogs players
Salem Red Sox players
San Antonio Missions players
Texas A&M Aggies baseball players
Toledo Mud Hens players
Winthrop Eagles baseball players
2017 World Baseball Classic players